Eugene Edward "Mercury" Morris (born January 5, 1947) is an American former professional football player who was a running back and kick returner. He played for eight years, primarily for the Miami Dolphins, in the American Football League (AFL) as a rookie in 1969 then in the American Football Conference (AFC) following the  merger with the National Football League (NFL).

Morris played in three Super Bowls, winning twice and was selected to three Pro Bowls.

In 1982, Morris was convicted of felony drug trafficking charges. After three and a half years in prison, he was released following a plea agreement in which he pleaded no contest to cocaine conspiracy charges.

Amateur career 
Born in Pittsburgh, Pennsylvania, Morris attended Avonworth High School in the northwestern suburbs of the city. He attended West Texas State University (now West Texas A&M University) from 1965 to 1969, where he was an All-American for the Buffaloes at tailback in 1967 and 1968. In 1967, he finished second in the nation to O. J. Simpson of USC in rushing yards with 1,274.

In his record setting year of 1968, Morris set collegiate records for rushing yards in a single game, with 340, rushing yards for a single season with 1,571, and rushing yards over a three-year college career (freshmen being ineligible), with 3,388. Simpson broke the single-season rushing record just one week after Morris set it. Morris' three-season career rushing record was broken two years later by Don McCauley.

After college, Morris was picked in the third round of the 1969 AFL-NFL Common Draft by the AFL's Miami Dolphins.

Professional football career

Early career 
Morris excelled as both a running back and kick returner. The majority of his playing days were spent with the Miami Dolphins. From 1969 to 1971, he backed up Jim Kiick at halfback and served as the Dolphins' primary kickoff return man. In his rookie year of 1969, Morris averaged 26.4 yards per kickoff return, leading the AFL in kickoff returns with 43 and in kickoff return yardage with 1136.  Both totals would have also led the NFL. His 105-yard return was the longest in the AFL that season, and he was also one of the AFL's leading punt returners that year. In 1970, he missed some time on the field due to a leg injury, but his 6.8 yard per carry average on 60 runs was the highest in the league among players with at least 50 runs.

Super Bowl years 
In 1971, despite being unhappy with his minimal playing time as backup halfback, he helped the Dolphins to their first Super Bowl, Super Bowl VI, by leading the American Football Conference (AFC) with a 28.2 yard kickoff return average. During the regular season, Morris also made the most of his opportunities at running back, gaining 315 rushing yards on 57 carries for a 5.5 yard average, an average that would have led the NFL if he had enough carries to qualify. That season, Morris was selected for the Pro Bowl for the first time as a kick returner, although he also was used as a running back in the game.

In the 1972 and 1973 seasons, Morris earned Super Bowl rings in Super Bowl VII and Super Bowl VIII and was selected for the Pro Bowl in both years. In 1972, he shared the halfback position with Kiick, participating in a few less plays than Kiick but having more carries as a running back. That year, he ran for exactly 1,000 yds on 190 carries, becoming, with teammate Larry Csonka, the first 1,000-yard tandem in NFL history. Morris was first thought to have finished with 991 yards but the Dolphins' management asked the league to examine a play in which Morris fumbled a lateral so he was awarded the nine yards previously recorded as lost on the play, giving him 1,000 yards for the season. That year, Morris also led the NFL with 12 rushing touchdowns  and his 5.3 yard per carry average was third in the NFL.

By 1973, Morris had taken over the starting halfback spot and rushed for 954 yards on 149 carries, despite playing with a neck injury late in the season. His 6.4 yard per carry average led the NFL that season, and he finished third in the NFL in rushing touchdowns.

Morris excelled in several playoff games leading up to Miami's two Super Bowl victories. In 1972, he led the Dolphins in rushing in both the divisional playoff game against Cleveland and the AFC Championship Game against Pittsburgh with 72 yards and 76 yards respectively. In 1973, he led the Dolphins in rushing for the divisional playoff game against Cincinnati with 106 yards and added 86 more rushing yards in the AFC Championship Game against Oakland.

Late career 

Morris continued playing for the Dolphins in 1974 and 1975, before spending the last season of his shortened career playing for the San Diego Chargers in 1976. In 1974, he was slated to become the team's primary running back after Csonka defected to the World Football League, but a knee injury Morris suffered in the preseason limited him to five regular season games that year. In 1975, Morris led the Dolphins in rushing yards, with 875, despite sharing the halfback position with Benny Malone.  After being traded to San Diego before the 1976 season, he ran for 256 yards on 50 carries that year and decided to retire after the season, in part due to lingering difficulties from the neck injury suffered in a 1973 game against the Pittsburgh Steelers and reinjured in a car accident.

Morris finished in the top five of the NFL in rushing touchdowns twice and total touchdowns once during his eight-year career. His career 5.1 yard per carry average was third all time among NFL players (1st among half backs) behind just fullbacks Jim Brown and Marion Motley.  As of 2017, he ranked 6th all time behind Brown, Motley, running back Jamaal Charles and quarterbacks Michael Vick and Randall Cunningham.  Morris' career kickoff return average of 26.5 is among the all-time top 20 for players with at least 100 returns, and was in the top 10 at the time of his retirement.  As of 2017 he was ranked 18th.

Post-football career 

In 1974, Morris co-starred as Bookie Garrett in the blaxploitation film The Black Six alongside other football stars of the day.

In 1982, Morris was convicted of cocaine trafficking. He was sentenced to 20 years imprisonment, with a mandatory 15-year term. On March 6, 1986, his conviction was overturned by the Florida Supreme Court because evidence he had offered to prove his entrapment defense had been excluded under a mistaken characterization as hearsay. Morris was granted a new trial. He was able to reach a plea bargain with the prosecutor, resulting in his release from prison on May 23, 1986 after having served three years. He later appeared in an anti-cocaine Public Service Announcement where he talked about his time in prison.

Morris later went on to a career as a motivational speaker.

Towards the end of 2006, he was in a television commercial spot for a hair-treatment clinic along with Wade Boggs.

References

External links 
 Pro-Football-Reference.com stats
 

1947 births
Living people
American football running backs
American motivational speakers
Miami Dolphins players
San Diego Chargers players
West Texas A&M Buffaloes football players
American Conference Pro Bowl players
Players of American football from Pittsburgh
American drug traffickers
American people convicted of drug offenses
American sportspeople convicted of crimes
American Football League players